Horace Roscoe Cayton Sr. (1859–1940) was an American journalist and political activist. The son of a slave and a white plantation owner's daughter, Cayton went to Seattle, Washington, in the early 1890s, launching his own newspaper, the Seattle Republican, in 1894. The paper was the longest-lived of seven African-American newspapers appearing in Seattle between 1891 and 1901, terminating only in 1913.

A second publishing venture was launched by Cayton in 1916, with the launch of the eponymous Cayton's Weekly. Unlike its predecessor, this four-page tabloid was focused upon national and local news of interest to a black readership. Falling into financial difficulties in 1921, Cayton's Weekly briefly altered its production cycle to become Cayton's Monthly before folding completely.

Biography

Early years

Horace was born in 1859 on a plantation in Mississippi. After Emancipation, he and his family moved to a farm near Port Gibson, Mississippi. He graduated from Alcorn College (now Alcorn State University) and was attending that institution in 1872.

Newspaper publisher

He headed west, convinced that his education and will to succeed would help him reach his real potential, and ended up in Seattle where he worked as a political reporter for the Seattle Post-Intelligencer. Horace found employment at the Seattle Standard, the city’s first newspaper for African Americans, working at that paper until Its failure in 1893.

The following year, Cayton launched a newspaper of his own, the Seattle Republican, with its first issue seeing print in May 1894. The paper sought to appeal to both white and black readers, achieving some limited success in this regard, although the readership of the paper was modest, never exceeding about 2,000.

By 1896, Cayton married Susie Revels, a young woman he had met in college. Ms. Revels was the daughter of Senator Hiram Rhodes Revels, a Reconstruction-era Republican from the state of Mississippi remembered as the first African-American elected to the United States Senate. After the couple's marriage, Susie Revels Cayton would become associate editor of the Seattle Republican.

Cayton's Republican criticized the corruption of the Yukon Gold Rush-era administration of mayor Thomas J. Humes and, in particular, his police chief William L. Meredith, who proceeded to have Cayton arrested for criminal libel. He was acquitted. The resulting controversy was a factor in escalating scandal that led Meredith to resign and to attempt to gun down another of his accusers, John Considine. Considine ultimately shot Meredith in self-defense.

The Republican Party attracted many black people and Horace was able to win an important position in the party. He was a recurrent delegate to the county and state nominating conventions, secretary of the party’s King County convention in 1902, and for many years a member of the Republican State Central Committee. In Seattle, between 1900 and 1910, the number of blacks had risen by almost 2,000 people causing white prejudice to grow. Politically Horace lost power and after 1910 he never sat on the Republican State Central Committee or attended a Republican convention again.

Horace became a victim of Seattle’s changing racial and political pattern. On May 2, 1913, the Seattle Republican ceased operations after Horace lost a court case where he sued a restaurant for telling him not to return after they had served him.  He continued his career in publishing and issued Cayton’s Weekly from 1916 followed by "Cayton's Monthly"  until 1921 when he retired.

Later years

He sold his home on Capitol Hill and moved to an apartment house, which he owned and produced income. They lost two houses and the apartment building during the depression, but continued to live in the house paying $10 per month rent. Horace and his wife entered into activities of the ever-growing black community. They participated in many social and civic events. He continued his affiliation with the Republican Party through membership in the King County Colored Republican Club.

Death and legacy

Horace died in 1940 and was followed by Susie in 1943.

Horace's son Horace R. Cayton Jr. (1903–1970) became an educator, researcher, government official, newspaper columnist, and famous sociologist, notable for his anthropological work Black Metropolis, which he co-authored with St. Clair Drake. Lisa S. Weitzman says on Answers.com: "With the purpose of educating white America, the book further exposed and explained African American conduct, personality, and culture which emerged from the conditions imposed by the white world. Ultimately, Cayton and Drake concluded their book with a call for the government to work more aggressively to help African Americans achieve equality. Like his father, Cayton expressed an ongoing concern for racial equality and civil rights, a theme to which he repeatedly returned in his regular column for the Pittsburgh Courier."

Another son, Revels Cayton, became a labor leader and deputy mayor of San Francisco. Daughter Madge Cayton, like her brother Horace, earned a degree from the University of Washington, in her case a business degree. Another daughter, Lillie Cayton, was a social activist in Seattle and later in San Diego, California.

References

Other sources consulted

 Horace Cayton, Jr. Long Old Road: An Autobiography. New York: Trident Press, 1965; pp. 17–23.
 Esther Mumford, Seattle’s Black Victorians, 1852–1901. Seattle, WA: Ananse Press, 1980; pp. 86–91.
 Quintard Taylor, The Forging of a Black Community. Seattle, WA: University of Washington Press, 1994; pp. 19–20.

Works 

 Cayton's Legislative Manual: The Ninth Legislature of Washington. Seattle, WA: H.R. Cayton, 1905.
 Cayton's Campaign Compendium of Washington, 1908. Seattle, WA: H.R. Cayton, 1908.
 Cayton's Year Book: Seattle's Colored Citizens. Seattle, WA: H.R. Cayton and Son, 1923.
 Autobiographical Writings of Horace R. Cayton, Sr., Published in Cayton's Weekly, 1917–1920. Richard S. Hobbs, ed. Awali, Bahrain: R.S. Hobbs, 1987.

Further reading

 Horace R. Cayton, Jr., Long Old Road: An Autobiography. New York: Trident Press, 1965.

External links

  Seattle Republican Library of Congress
Susie Revels Cayton: "The Part She Played" and Revels Cayton: African American Communist and Labor Activist, from the Seattle Civil Rights and Labor History Project.

1859 births
1940 deaths
20th-century American newspaper founders
African-American journalists
American male journalists
Alcorn State University alumni
Writers from Seattle
People from Claiborne County, Mississippi
Washington (state) Republicans
Journalists from Mississippi
Journalists from Washington (state)
African-American history of Washington (state)
African-American history in Seattle
20th-century African-American people